Kolbino is a rural locality (a village) in Mayskoye Rural Settlement, Vologodsky District, Vologda Oblast, Russia. The population was 1 as of 2002.

Geography 
The distance to Vologda is 27 km, to Mayskoye is 13 km. Pasynkovo, Belavino, Kolbino, Ivanovskoye, Shatalovo are the nearest rural localities.

References 

Rural localities in Vologodsky District